Chubin (also Romanized as Chūbīn; also known as Chubāīn and Chūbāyen) is a village in Kah Rural District, Central District, Davarzan County, Razavi Khorasan Province, Iran. At the 2006 census, its population was 232, in 66 families.

References 

Populated places in Davarzan County